Namdapha National Park is a  large protected area in Arunachal Pradesh of Northeast India. The park was established in 1983. With more than 1,000 floral and about 1,400 faunal species, it is a biodiversity hotspot in the Eastern Himalayas. The national park harbours the northernmost lowland evergreen rainforests in the world at 27°N latitude. It also harbours extensive dipterocarp forests, comprising the northwestern parts of the Mizoram-Manipur-Kachin rain forests ecoregion.

It is the fourth largest national park in India.

History
Namdapha was originally declared a Wildlife Sanctuary in 1972, then a National Park in 1983 and became a Tiger Reserve under the Project Tiger scheme in the same year. Its name was a combination of two Singpho words, namely "nam" which means water, and "dapha" which means origin – the river originates from the Dapha Bum glaciers.

Geography and vegetation
Namdapha National Park is located in Changlang district of the Northeast Indian state of Arunachal Pradesh, near the international border with Myanmar. It is crossed from east to west by the Noa Dihing River that originates at the Chaukan Pass on the Indo-Myanmar border. The land cover changes with increasing elevation from tropical evergreen forest to temperate broadleaf and mixed forest. Secondary forests cover ; seasonal snow occurs at above  between December and March.

Flora

Sapria himalayana and Balanophora are root parasites related to Rafflesia recorded from the area. The floristic diversity of Namdapha is as follows:

Values in parentheses are percentage of total number.

Fauna

Mammals

The Namdapha flying squirrel (Biswamoyopterus biswasi) was first collected in the park and described. It is endemic to the park and critically endangered. It was last recorded in 1981 in a single valley within the park.

Four pantherine species are found in the park: leopard (Panthera pardus), snow leopard (P. uncia), tiger (P. tigris) and clouded leopard (Neofelis nebulosa).

Other predators present in the protected area are dhole, Malayan sun bear, Indian wolf and Asiatic black bear. Smaller carnivores include red panda, red fox, yellow-throated marten, Eurasian otter, Oriental small-clawed otter, spotted linsang, binturong, Asian palm civet, small Indian civet, large Indian civet, masked palm civet, marbled cat, fishing cat, Asian golden cat, and two mongoose species. Large herbivores are represented by Indian elephant, wild boar, musk deer, Indian muntjac, hog deer, sambar, gaur, goral, mainland serow, takin and bharal. Non-human primates present include stump-tailed macaque, slow loris, hoolock gibbon, capped langur, Assamese macaque and rhesus macaque.

Birds
Among the earlier papers on the birds of Namdapha was published in 1990. The park has about 425 bird species, with many more to be recorded from work in the higher areas. There are five species of hornbills recorded from the area. Several species of rare wren-babblers have been recorded in Namdapha. Other bird groups include laughing thrushes, parrotbills, fulvettas, shrike babblers and scimitar babblers. The snowythroated babbler is a rare species of babbler found only in the Patkai and Mishmi Hills and nearby areas in Northern Myanmar, is found in Namdapha. Other  rare,  restricted  range or  globally  endangered  species  include  the rufous-necked hornbill, green cochoa, purple cochoa, beautiful nuthatch, Ward's trogon, ruddy kingfisher, blue-eared kingfisher, white-tailed fish eagle, Eurasian hobby, pied falconet, white-winged wood duck, Himalayan wood-owl, rufous-throated hill-partridge, and whitecheeked hill partridge. Several leaf warblers and migrants such as amur falcon and several thrushes can be seen here. The first mid-winter waterfowl census in Namdapha was conducted in 1994 when species such as the white-bellied heron, a critically endangered bird, was recorded for the first time.

Butterflies and moths
The region is very rich in Lepidoptera species. Both butterflies and moths are found in equal abundance here, along with a variety of other insects. As per the observations taken during the National Camp organised in October 2014 by Bombay Natural History Society, a lot of rare species of butterflies were seen. These include the koh-i-noor, naga treebrown, red caliph, cruiser, wizard, fluffy tit, East Himalayan purple emperor.

See also
 Tourism in North East India
 Wildlife of India

References

External links

Official Website of Namdapha National Park
Website of Namdapha created by the Nature Conservation Foundation

Eastern Himalayan broadleaf forests
Tiger reserves of India
National parks in Arunachal Pradesh
Changlang
Protected areas of Arunachal Pradesh
Protected areas established in 1974
Tourism in Northeast India
1974 establishments in Arunachal Pradesh
Environment of Arunachal Pradesh
1983 establishments in Arunachal Pradesh
Protected areas established in 1983
World Heritage Tentative List for India